Barikan may refer to various places in Iran:
 Barikan, Alborz
 Barikan, Bushehr
 Berikan, Bushehr Province